Nivedita Vidyapith is an English Medium school located at Barrackpore, West Bengal India. This is a girls' school and is affiliated to the West Bengal Board of Secondary Education for Madhyamik Pariksha (10th Board exams), and to the West Bengal Council of Higher Secondary Education for Higher Secondary Examination (12th Board exams).
The current student count of this school is 600. The teacher in charge is ANURADHA DUTTA. Nivedita Vidyapith whole heartedly persuades the students to indulge in the cultivation of English education.

References 

High schools and secondary schools in West Bengal
Girls' schools in Kolkata
Schools in North 24 Parganas district
Educational institutions in India with year of establishment missing